Katanga may refer to:

Political entities
Katanga Province, a former province of the Democratic Republic of the Congo
State of Katanga, a breakaway state which existed from 1960 to 1963
Katanga Crisis or "Congo Crisis", a period of turmoil in the First Republic of the Congo from 1960 to 1965
Haut-Katanga Province, a province of the Democratic Republic of the Congo, created in 2015
Katanga insurgency, an ongoing rebellion by a number of rebel groups in the Democratic Republic of the Congo
Katanga Slum, a settlement in central Uganda
History of Katanga, details of the region from early times, under Luba kingdom, Belgian rule, independent Congo

Places
Katanga, Dominican Republic, a section of Los Mina, founded by maroons from the Congo who fled French rule
Katanga Plateau, a plateau in the Democratic Republic of the Congo
Garenganze or Katanga in Central Africa, the home of the pre-colonial Yeke Kingdom of Msiri
Katanga River, a river in Russia

People
Germain Katanga (born 1978), a Congolese militia leader accused of war crimes and crimes against humanity before the International Criminal Court
Simon Katanga, a fictional character in the film Raiders of the Lost Ark

Other uses
1817 Katanga, a main-belt asteroid
Luba-Katanga language, a Bantu language spoken in the Democratic Republic of the Congo

See also
Khatanga (disambiguation)
Katana (disambiguation)